Kosov may refer to:

Dynasties
Kosov (Hasidic dynasty)

Places in the Czech Republic
Kosov (Šumperk District), a municipality and village in the Olomouc Region
Kosov, a village and part of Bor (Tachov District) in the Plzeň Region
Kosov, a village and part of Jihlava in the Vysočina Region
Kosov, a village and part of Kamenný Újezd (České Budějovice District) in the South Bohemian Region
Košov, a village and part of Lomnice nad Popelkou in the Liberec Region

Surname
Kosov (surname)

See also
Kosiv, a city in Ukraine
Kosovo